Fast X (also known as Fast & Furious 10) is an upcoming American action film directed by Louis Leterrier from a screenplay by Justin Lin, Zach Dean, and Dan Mazeau. It is the sequel to F9 (2021), serving as the tenth and penultimate main installment, and the eleventh full-length film in the Fast & Furious franchise. The film stars an ensemble cast including Vin Diesel, Michelle Rodriguez, Tyrese Gibson, Chris "Ludacris" Bridges, Jason Momoa, Nathalie Emmanuel, Jordana Brewster, John Cena, Jason Statham, Sung Kang, Alan Ritchson, Daniela Melchior, Scott Eastwood, Helen Mirren, Charlize Theron, Brie Larson, and Rita Moreno. 

With the tenth film planned since 2014, and a two-part finale planned since October 2020, Lin was confirmed to return to direct with the main cast attached. The film's official title was revealed when principal photography began in April 2022. Lin left as director later that month, citing creative differences, though he retained writing and producing credits. Leterrier was then hired as his replacement a week later, and performed several uncredited rewrites to the screenplay. Longtime franchise composer Brian Tyler returned to score the film. With an estimated production budget of $340 million, it is the seventh-most expensive film ever made. Filming lasted until that August, taking place in London, Rome, Turin, Lisbon, and Los Angeles.

Fast X is scheduled to be released in the United States on May 19, 2023, by Universal Pictures. Its sequel, intended to be the main series' final installment, is also in development.

Premise 
Dominic Toretto must protect his crew and family from Cipher, who now joins forces with Dante Reyes, the son of drug lord Hernan Reyes, seeking revenge for his father's death in Fast Five (2011).

Cast 
 Vin Diesel as Dominic "Dom" Toretto:A former criminal and professional street racer who has retired and settled down with his wife, Letty Ortiz, and his son, Brian Marcos. In an interview, Leterrier described Fast X as exploring the fallout of Dom's actions in previous installments, saying "[Dom] has fought so hard to keep faith and protect family [but] there is a price to pay. His enemies are coming after him". 
 Michelle Rodriguez as Letty Ortiz: Dom's wife and a former criminal and professional street racer.
 Tyrese Gibson as Roman Pearce: An ex-habitual offender, expert street racer, and a member of Dom's team.
 Chris "Ludacris" Bridges as Tej Parker: A tech expert, mechanic, and a member of Dom's team.
 Jason Momoa as Dante Reyes:The son of drug lord Hernan Reyes, seeking revenge against Dom and his crew for his father's death during the events of Fast Five (2011). Momoa described the character as Dom's foil, saying Dante is "very sadistic and androgynous and he's a bit of a peacock… He's got a lot of issues. He's definitely got some daddy issues". Momoa expressed a desire to play against type when portraying Dante, taking on a "less macho" character. 
 Nathalie Emmanuel as Ramsey: A computer hacktivist and a member of Dom's team. Emmanuel said her character sees increased involvement in Fast X compared to the previous films.
 Jordana Brewster as Mia Toretto: Dom and Jakob's sister and a member of Dom's team who has settled down with her partner, Brian O'Conner, and their two children.
 John Cena as Jakob Toretto: Dom and Mia's brother and a master thief, assassin, and high-performance driver who once worked as an agent for Mr. Nobody.
 Jason Statham as Deckard Shaw:A former opponent of Dom and his team, who became a new member after saving Dom's son. Shaw's younger brother, Owen, was hospitalized working for Cipher.
 Sung Kang as Han Lue: An expert drifter and member of Dom's team who previously faked his death.
 Alan Ritchson as Agent Aimes: The new leader of Mr. Nobody's agency who does not think too fondly of Dom and his crew.
 Daniela Melchior as a Brazilian street racer with a powerful tie to Dom’s past.
Scott Eastwood as Eric Reisner / Little Nobody: A government law enforcement agent who worked under Mr. Nobody.
 Helen Mirren as Magdalene "Queenie" Ellmanson-Shaw: The leader of a female militia and mother of Dom's former enemies Deckard and Owen, and MI6 agent Hattie.
 Charlize Theron as Cipher:A criminal mastermind and cyberterrorist who is an enemy of Dom's team and is working with Dante. Leterrier described Cipher as the "devil" and speaking on her dynamic with Dante, Leterrier said, "They are bad news, but one is more afraid than the other. One is worse news than the other".
 Brie Larson as Tess:A rogue representative of Mr. Nobody's agency who allies with Dom and his crew. Leterrier said Tess "is connected to the franchise in a very strong way".
 Rita Moreno as Abuela Toretto: The grandmother of Dom, Jakob, and Mia.

Michael Rooker is set to return as Buddy, a mechanic who was a member of Dom, Jakob, and Mia's father's pit crew, and Cardi B as Leysa, a member of Magdalene's crew who shares history with Dom; they both reprised their roles from F9 (2021). Leo Abelo Perry will appear as Brian Marcos, Dom and Elena's son.Don Omar and Tego Calderón are set to reprise their roles from previous films as mechanics Rico Santos and Tego Leo, respectively.

Production

Development 
In November 2014, Universal Pictures chairwoman Donna Langley said there would be at least three more films in the franchise after Furious 7 (2015). In April 2017, producer Neal H. Moritz stated that the tenth entry would serve as the finale for the franchise with Chris Morgan attached as screenwriter. In October 2017, Justin Lin entered negotiations to direct the ninth and tenth installments, after directing four films in the series. In February 2020, Vin Diesel hinted the film could be split in two, which he confirmed in an April 2021 press conference, stating, "There's so much ground to cover and so many places in so many locations that we have to visit" as the rationale behind the decision for a two-part finale. Prior to production, Diesel announced filming would take place in Italy, stating, "I was asked, 'Would there ever be a Fast where you could film in Italy?', and I [promised] we would". While Morgan ultimately did not return as screenwriter, it was confirmed he would serve as an executive producer on the film, alongside Joseph M. Caracciolo, Jr., David Cain, Amanda Lewis, and Mark Bomback.

By April 2022, a new screenplay draft was written by Lin and Dan Mazeau. On June 5, 2022, Tyrese Gibson announced Fast X would see the franchise "going back to its roots", with reports indicating this to be a return to street racing elements of previous entries, although shared details the film would also continue to explore the history of the Toretto family in a "similar" vein to F9; Leterrier later revealed the film focuses on increased familial responsibilities, saying, "Dom was always a lone wolf. He was living a quarter mile at a time [but] the stakes are real now. [He is] responsible for a human being, an innocent life [he] brought into the world". Gibson also expressed a desire for the franchise to film in South Africa, stating, "me and Luda always had this idea [that] it's time for us to head to South Africa. It needs real estate in this franchise [because] it [has] a beautiful skyline with ocean. It's the Fast and Furious package". Ludacris later stated his favorite franchise filming location was his home city of Atlanta, Georgia. During an August 2022 interview with ComicBook, Nathalie Emmanuel said "the stakes are higher on a more personal level in this [film]", indicating a more grounded approach compared to previous installments. In developing the character of Dante, Leterrier revealed they wanted to forge the "anti-Dom", saying, "[Dante] is the yang of [Dom's] yin, the antichrist of his Christ" and wanted to give Dante clear character motivation with Dom's role in Dante's tragic origin story, noting, "There are strong ties with [Dante and Dom] and that is what makes an amazing villain because you understand why they became this and [their motivations]". Leterrier noted Larson's character as also being influenced by "the generational legacy of the characters", saying, "Everybody [in the franchise] has a different point of view on Dom and his own influence on their lives. And that's how she [fits in]".

Describing the film's retcon of Fast Five (2011), Leterrier said it was to "explore the price of justice", noting, "[We] Rashomon'ed [the fifth film] to experience it through the eyes of Reyes, with Dom and Brian the thieves. We [wanted to] guide the audience to rethink everything they've experienced in the franchise [because] a good antagonist has their own truth, [separate] from the protagonists". Leterrier noted the film touches on each previous installment, saying, "The snowball [of Dom's actions] has picked up speed and became an avalanche", and said his favorite film in the franchise is Fast Five. Leterrier later revealed he performed several uncredited rewrites to the entire screenplay on his initial travel to the set, stating he lacked sleep for the first four days he worked on the film. During the film's early promotional run, Leterrier said Fast X explores the potential breakup of family, noting "people are going to need to take sides [and] alliances will need to be made" compounded by "[the] war brewing" between the characters, saying "there will be some tremendous casualties". He later confirmed the film will end on a cliffhanger.

In an interview with Collider, Universal Pictures producer Kelly McCormick stated the impact of COVID-19 and the production schedules of "our interfering projects" (like Fast X and its sequel) caused delays in developing the sequel to Fast & Furious Presents: Hobbs & Shaw (2019). Filming in Turin required the Film Commission Torino Piemonte, local authorities, and city councillors to conduct a five month planning schedule from September 2021 and January 2022, collaborating with the Departments of Culture to co-ordinate the city's major events, roads and transport, public, and security around filming requirements. Such planning included managing the overflight of drones and limitations on circulation made necessary for the management and safety of the set.

Vehicles

Fast X is the first film in the series to feature electric cars, with leaked set photos featuring the 2024 Dodge Charger Daytona SRT Banshee Concept and the gull-winged DeLorean Alpha5. Other vehicles set to feature include the 2022 TorRed Dodge Charger R/T, the 2023 Dodge Charger SRT Hellcat Redeye, and the 1970 Charger R/T, the latter a franchise staple. On June 27, 2022, it was reported Fast X would include the fan favorite orange and black Veilside Mazda RX-7 FD Fortune, which first featured in The Fast and the Furious: Tokyo Drift (2006). The inclusion of the electric Dodge Chargers in the film was confirmed upon release of the first trailer on February 9, 2023, with the "Greys of Thunder" Dodge Charger Daytona SRT also appearing in other promotional material. In an interview with Fox News, a Dodge spokesperson said the company "has a long-standing marketing partnership with Fast & Furious", which will continue with Fast X. Other vehicles expected to feature in the film include the foreign-made Lamborghini Gallardo, Alfa Romeo 159, Nissan Silvia, Porsche 911 997 GT3 RS, and the Datsun 240Z, as well as the U.S.-made Chevrolet Impala and El Camino and the 1966 Ford Fairlane. According to Hot Cars, vehicles that feature in Fast & Furious films typically sees an increase demand for those vehicles: after the Datsun 240Z featured in Tokyo Drift, it saw average immediate prices for the car rise in the U.S. from $5,000 to $30,000 in 2006.

Casting 
In June 2021, Diesel revealed that Cardi B would reprise her role as Leysa in the tenth film, after the character debuted in F9 (2021). Later that month, Diesel announced the film would be split in a two-part culmination to the franchise, with principal photography slated to begin in January 2022 and take place back-to-back. In December 2021, Dwayne Johnson ruled out returning for Fast X, and labelled an Instagram post by Diesel asking for his return as "manipulation", with publications indicating he was referring to his reported feud with Diesel stemming from Diesel's role as an executive producer on The Fate of the Furious (2017). Writing for Screen Rant, Cooper Hood said the film's connection to Fast Five and Johnson's absence presented storyline difficulties, saying, "The flashbacks [in Fast X] to a time in the franchise when [Johnson] was a major part of the story could get awkward quickly", and speculated the film may be forced to cut around Johnson's character or include recycled or unused footage in his place.

In early 2022, Jason Momoa was cast as Dante, the villain, while Daniela Melchior, Brie Larson, and Alan Ritchson joined the cast by that April. Describing Mamoa's addition, director Louis Leterrier said Dante is "an incredible new character. It’s 1,000 per cent Momoa", while Michelle Rodriguez said Dante is "malicious but he can be playful. It's like a fresh energy. There's something charming about him". In May, Rita Moreno was cast as Abuela Toretto, the grandmother of Dom, Jakob, and Mia, with Leterrier describing her inclusion as the "guiding light that Dom is following", adding, "[Abuela] is his conscience, [she is one] of the people that keep him grounded. When your grandmother who you haven't seen for years comes and gives you a message that becomes guiding for the second part of your life, you listen". In a February 2023 interview with Collider, Moreno's grandson said he pitched for her inclusion in Fast X after he met Diesel at the premiere for West Side Story (2021), which starred Moreno.

On December 23, 2022, it was revealed that Gal Gadot, who portrayed Gisele Yashar in three previous installments, filmed a scene for Fast X; according to social media reports, she appeared in one of two versions of the film screened three days prior, with further details about the nature of her return undisclosed. Gadot's potential return was met with mixed reception by fans and critics; some criticized the franchise's history of reviving dead characters to capitalize on star power, labelling it "ineffective" fan service which negatively impacts the previous installments and the story of the franchise. Others were positive about Gadot's potential return, citing her portrayal of one of the franchise's most popular characters. In a February 2023 interview with ComicBook, Sung Kang refused to rule out Gadot's character being resurrected in Fast X. As the final cast rounded out, it sparked debate that it could create a story problem for the film; writing for Screen Rant, Ryan Northrup said, "With such a large cast, it's uncertain whether Fast X will be able to serve [every] character in a satisfying way. With many new and returning characters, [every] arc may not be as fleshed out [and if] new characters aren't given much screen time or development, [it will be] a disappointment. [It may be] up to the finale to rectify [it]". A month later, a leaked email from the The Hollywood Reporter revealed some crew returned after principal photography had completed to film a "button or tag" (a mid or post-credits scene) that will feature "a guest cameo".

Following the release of the film's trailer on February 9, 2023, Leterrier hinted archival footage featuring Paul Walker from previous films may be used in Fast X, saying, "Brian is very much alive in [this franchise]. This [film] jumps back and forth between the past and the present. You will see Brian in the past, you won't see Brian in the present. [His] family is part of this franchise. It has to be the right moment, the right tone [if] Brian has to re-enter the franchise. [It must be] as perfect as how he left". Regarding Walker's inclusion, Rodriguez said, "It's really hard to [make the films] without a blessing of some sort from [his] family because it’s everything. Without that kind of like that love from them, we would be lost". She also revealed Furious 7 (2015) is her favorite film in the franchise, citing its emotional tribute to Walker.

Filming 
Principal photography began on April 21, 2022, with the film's title being revealed and Michelle Rodriguez, Tyrese Gibson, Chris "Ludacris" Bridges, Jordana Brewster, Nathalie Emmanuel, Sung Kang, and Charlize Theron confirmed to reprise their roles. According to Diesel, an earlier draft excluded Brewster's character, which he overturned. The next day, Michael Rooker was confirmed to reprise his role as Buddy from F9. Fast X production budget was initially reported to be $300 million in May 2022, which was revised to $340 million that November; the cast was reportedly paid $100 million for their involvement, including $20 million for Diesel. Other costs for the rising budget (which factors in tax-incentive offsets) included increases in production costs caused by global inflation and charges for pandemic testing requirements mandated by COVID-19 safety protocols. According to unnamed sources reporting to Radar, Diesel reportedly "stressed" over the increased budget and the creative decisions in Fast X; sources wrote Diesel is considered by Universal as "simultaneously the greatest star [they've] had and their biggest headache" and that "[Diesel] doesn't let anybody forget [how] the Fast & Furious franchise is important to the whole [film] industry". 

A week after filming commenced, Lin exited the film as director due to "creative differences", leaving primary production stalled. However, Lin will remain on board as a producer. Later reports alleged that Lin clashed on set with Diesel, who purportedly arrived out of shape, was often late, and did not remember his lines. Lin was also upset with rewrites to his screenplay, as well as changing filming locations and one of the film's villains having yet to be cast; a disagreement with Diesel reportedly escalated to the point it caused Lin to shout, "This movie is not worth my mental health." Second unit production remained ongoing in the United Kingdom while the studio sought for a replacement director. Universal Pictures reportedly spent $1 million a day to pause production. Former Fast & Furious directors F. Gary Gray and David Leitch, who previously directed The Fate of the Furious and Fast & Furious Presents: Hobbs & Shaw respectively, were considered by the studio to replace Lin, however neither were likely to step in due to their commitments with Lift (2023) and The Fall Guy (2024), respectively. Furious 7 director James Wan, who was once considered to direct The Fate of the Furious but declined due to his straining experience on Furious 7, was also considered a "viable option" but was tied with commitments to Aquaman and the Lost Kingdom (2023). Variety reported hiring an "A-list" director was not probable without drastic changes to the screenplay and Universal would likely turn to a second unit director "well-versed" in big-budget action films. On May 2, 2022, Louis Leterrier was announced as Lin's replacement. 

Leterrier already had an established relationship with the studio, having previously directed The Incredible Hulk (2008), and he was knowledgeable about the franchise; he and franchise star Jason Statham went to watch the original film in Paris in 2001 while on a break from filming The Transporter (2002). Leterrier joined filming in London after scheduling and contractual considerations were confirmed; he later revealed he initially rejected the offer to direct the film, labelling it a "massive" task. Production in London concluded in mid-August, with scenes filmed at Warner Bros. Studios, Leavesden. Describing his style for the film, Leterrier said, "I'm more practical than other directors, and I brought [the franchise] back to earth", favoring real stunts (including pushing for a return of racing scenes) enhanced with visual effects, as opposed to largely computer generated placements in the recent installments.

Filming took place in Genzano di Roma in mid-May. Filming took place in Rome for two weeks in mid-May, and one week in mid-July, with scenes being shot at the Via Cristoforo Colombo, Lungotevere, Via dei Fori Imperiali, Ponte Umberto I, Ponte Vittorio Emanuele II, and the area around the Castel Sant'Angelo and the Spanish Steps. Filming then took place in Turin between May 24 and June 6, with action sequences filmed at the Piazza Crimea and Corso Fiume, Murazzi del Po, Via Roma, and the Piazza IV Marzo. Momoa began shooting his scenes on May 16. Like previous installments, Diesel supervised writing and design of the film's action sequences; according to unnamed sources to The Hollywood Reporter, Diesel's creative control and frequent last-minute changes reflect "a process [which] is like a mosaic that doesn't stop moving", labelling him "demanding" and a perfectionist. On June 6, it was reported a stuntman was injured in an accident after being hit by part of a car after an explosion. On July 22, in an interview with Deadline Hollywood while at San Diego Comic-Con, Rodriguez announced she had completed filming her scenes and said "only four [or] five weeks [are] left" in production. Filming in Angelino Heights (the location of the Toretto house) faced protest from some local residents after production gave notice of the filming of a sequence which would involve "simulated emergency services activity, aerial photography, wetting down of street and atmospheric smoke". According to those residents, the protest was to raise awareness for road safety education, claiming the franchise caused their neighborhood to become a hot spot for fans to engage in street racing and other dangerous activity. Filming managed to occur following the protest on August 26, while other portions were filmed in Portugal, such as in Lisbon, Viseu, and Vila Real. In an interview with Lusa News Agency, Conceição Azevedo, the mayor of Viseu, announced filming would take place on IP5, a highway in the Vouzela municipality. Ritchson finished filming his scenes by August 16, and hinted at flying cars in the film, stating "we're going to take it to the sky".

During filming, Sofia Noronha, a producer for Sagesse Productions (the company in charge of overseeing production of Fast X in Portugal) said a "brutal economic investment" will be made in the country by the film. Highlighting the weather, affordability through tax breaks, and flexibility of the production, Noronha argued "investments [from film] made in the country is almost double that tax incentive. The [producing] country always benefits". This was echoed during filming in Turin, with it reported the two-week schedule generated  for the local economy, coming mainly from expenses related to location rent, hospitality, technical staff and local workforce employment, security and sanitation, and storage and unloading. It was also reported the film regularly brought troupes of close to 400 people (5 times above average for comparable films) and often collaborated with hundreds of local professionals on the research of locations and finalization of the working filming plan. In a statement, Beatrice Borgia, President of Film Commission Torino Piemonte, said "Fast X is a confirmation of the key role Turin and Piedmont has gained in filmmaking. [We have] proved to have all what is needed to host complex productions: skilled professionals, supportive institutions, and amazing locations".

Post-production

Dylan Highsmith and Kelly Matsumoto, both of whom were two of the three co-editors on F9, return as editors with Laura Yanovich and Corbin Mehl joining. Peter Chiang returns as the visual effects supervisor for the production, after doing so for F9, with DNEG and Industrial Light & Magic as the returning visual effects vendors. Composer Brian Tyler also returned. In a July 2022 interview with the Hollywood Reporter, Michelle Rodriguez praised the addition of Leterrier and his predominantly French-speaking creative team, labelling it "the French takeover, dude". She stated Leterrier "came with all this energy of love [from] a real fan of [the] franchise who really wants to take it places that it hasn't gone before. It reminds you [how] beautiful and magical [filmmaking] is". Several aerial shots were filmed with first-person view (FPV) drones with an attached RED Komodo camera piloted by Johnny Schaer, similar to the filming techniques that were used for the action sequences in Michael Bay's Ambulance (2022). Schaer previously supervised the drone-led filming in Rawson Marshall Thurber's Red Notice (2021).

Music
The first single for the film's soundtrack, "Let's Ride", was released on February 10, 2023, performed by YG, Ty Dolla $ign, and Lambo4oe. The soundtrack is expected to feature hip hop, pop, reggaeton, electronic rock, and rhythmic Latin tracks. Veteran franchise composer, Brian Tyler, was confirmed as composer on March 8, 2023.

Marketing 

Parts of Fast X previewed at CineEurope in Barcelona in June 2022, including a first look at Jason Momoa and Brie Larson. Speaking of the film, Universal Pictures International President of Distribution, Veronika Kwan Vandenberg, stated the studio's drive was to continue to "cater to the diverse tastes" expected from the franchise. At the 2022 Grio Awards, Tyrese Gibson stated he watched the completed film on October 20, 2022, describing it as "crazy" with "just too much magic", and announced an extended version of the film's trailer would first premiere at Super Bowl LVII on February 12, 2023. This was seemingly confirmed in a December 2022 social media post by Vin Diesel, who wrote the trailer was "less than two months away", and was made it official in January 2023 post. In a January 2023 report by Collider, it was confirmed the first trailer would debut worldwide on February 10, 2023 (after being screened at a private fan event a day prior); it was three minutes long, and was followed with a Super Bowl spot alongside Dungeons & Dragons: Honor Among Thieves, Cocaine Bear, Scream VI, 65, Air, Guardians of the Galaxy: Volume 3 and The Flash (all 2023). Beginning February 1, to promote the release of the trailer, official recuts of the trailers of each of the previous nine films, dubbed "Legacy Trailers", were released daily in conjunction with IGN. The fan event took place at L.A. Live in downtown Los Angeles, being hosted by Maria Menounos and featuring Diesel, Rodriguez, Gibson, Ludacris, and Cody Walker, the brother of the series' longtime initial star Paul Walker. Similar fan events also took place in Mexico, France, and Japan but did not feature the cast.

On February 1, the film's teaser poster was released, depicting Diesel alone in the center, bowing his head and clutching a cross between his fists on a dark to light backdrop. Writing for Collider, Safeeyah Kazi said his positioning depicts "an intense prayer" with the "small amount of light [from the cross] engulfing his fist acting as the optimism in the dark". She also said that the relative simplicity of the poster compared to the "color explosion" for F9 could indicate a grittier storyline in Fast X. Kazi wrote the film's "the end of the road begins" tagline depicted "a new level of intensity", and speculated it could refer to the end for some of the franchise's characters. In an analysis by Matt Singer of WBUF, Singer described the poster as "somber", noting it as "remarkably tense" compared to the posters for other entries in the franchise. Stills from the film detailing Momoa, Larson, and Diesel's characters were publicly released on February 9, and was followed by a teaser showcasing the main cast a day later. The official trailer then released soon after, featuring an orchestral flip of "Notorious Thugs" by The Notorious B.I.G. and Bone Thugs-n-Harmony from the former's album Life After Death (1997). The trailer was mostly postively received; writing for GQ, Grant Rindner labelled the trailer "glorious absurdity", stating it is "as glossy and over-the-top as recent features". He commended the return of racing scenes, saying it "restores the original feeling" of the films, and said the music was an "operatic nail-biter".

According to data from social media analytics company RelishMix, the film's Super Bowl trailer (dubbed "The Big Game Trailer") clocked 94.1 million views across social media in the 24 hour period following the game; it was the third most viewed trailer that aired at the event, behind Guardians of the Galaxy Vol. 3 (134.1 million views) and The Flash (97.4 million). It was the highest-viewed trailer which did not debut at the event, but its view count was down from the 110.9 million views received by F9s Super Bowl trailer in 2020, prior to that film's eventual delay. According to unnamed sources reporting to Variety, the first trailer accumulated an estimated 295 million views globally within the first 72 hours of release; Instagram drove nearly 30% of views, followed by TikTok (25%), Facebook (22%), YouTube (18%) and Twitter (6%), with a majority of viewership coming in from international territories. Fast X also trended as the top topic on Twitter in the U.S. immediately after the trailer debut. Similar to other Fast & Furious releases, Hot Wheels announced a themed basic assortment of cars set to feature in Fast X, which is set to be released with the film.

Release

Theatrical 
Fast X is scheduled to be released first in Belgium, France, and Sweden on May 17, 2023, and in the United States on May 19. In February 2016, Diesel announced initial release dates for the ninth and tenth films, with the tenth film initially set to be released on April 2, 2021. After F9 was delayed to the tenth film's release date due to the COVID-19 pandemic, the tenth film's release date was delayed indefinitely. In June 2021, Diesel announced a targeted release date of February 2023 and February 2024 for the tenth and eleventh films. That August, Fast X was officially announced to be released on April 7, 2023. In December, the film was pushed back to May 2023, and is scheduled to be widely released, including in IMAX and other premium large formats.

Reception

Box office 
Writing for TheWrap, Jeremy Fuster estimated that Fast X may be less profitable than its immediate predecessors, citing the film's sudden increased overall production budget (at 70% larger than F9) and the expected large marketing budget.

Pre-sale ticketing 
Tickets went on sale the midnight of February 9, 2023, a day prior to the premiere of the trailer, across several ticket websites such as Fandango and AMC Theatres.

Sequel 
A sequel, which is planned to serve as the eleventh and final main installment, is in development. Prior to development of Fast X, in September 2021, longtime series director Justin Lin said, "The idea of the last chapter being two films is correct. Every day, I try to configure and make sure whatever we're [discussing] will yield the best result. I think having one chapter in two movies is correct". This was supported in an interview by Louis Leterrier, who replaced Lin as director for Fast X, and stated, "[Fast X] is big. What we're planning for the next [film] is gigantic, in terms of action, scope and emotion. You will feel all the feels. Tears will roll". In February 2023, Diesel said he wanted Robert Downey Jr. to star in the final installment as the main antagonist, revealing a character has been developed which is "the antithesis of Dom". Rodriguez said she wanted Matt Damon to be included in the final film. Later that month, Diesel also confirmed the eleventh film will be the final main installment, saying, "What gets harder [about the films] is the work off-screen. The thinking, the expanding... It's hard to continue mythologies. There's a reason why Tolkien stopped writing after a while".

Notes

References

External links 
 
 

2023 action thriller films
2020s American films
2020s English-language films
American action thriller films
American road movies
American sequel films
Fast & Furious films
Films about automobiles
Films postponed due to the COVID-19 pandemic
Films directed by Louis Leterrier
Films produced by Vin Diesel
Films produced by Neal H. Moritz
Films produced by Joe Roth
Films produced by Clayton Townsend
Films shot in London
Films shot in Rome
IMAX films
One Race Films films
Original Film films
Universal Pictures films
Upcoming English-language films
Upcoming sequel films